Bald sea urchin disease is a bacterial disease known to affect several species of sea urchins in the Mediterranean Sea, North Atlantic and along the California coastline. Research suggests two pathogens are responsible for the disease, Listonella anguillarum and Aeromonas salmonicida.

Infection generally occurs at the site of an existing physical injury. The affected area turns green and spines and other appendages are lost. If the lesion remains shallow and covers less than 30% of the animal's surface area, the animal tends to survive and eventually regenerates any lost tissue. However, if the damage is more extensive or so deep that the hard inner test is perforated, the disease is fatal.

Affected species
 Allocentrotus fragilis
 Arbacia lixula
 Cidaris cidaris
 Echinus esculentus
 Paracentrotus lividus
 Psammechinus miliaris
 Sphaerechinus granularis
 Strongylocentrotus droebachiensis
 Strongylocentrotus franciscanus
 Strongylocentrotus purpuratus

References
 

Animal bacterial diseases
Echinoidea